Bacque or Bacqué is a surname. Notable people with the surname include:

François Bacqué (born 1936), French bishop and Vatican diplomat
Gene Bacque (1937–2019), American baseball player
Hervé Bacqué (born 1976), French football player
James Bacque (born 1929), Canadian writer
Odon Bacqué (born 1944), American politician and non-fiction writer

French-language surnames